Myer is a department store that operates Australia-wide.

Myer may refer to:

 Myer (name)
 Myer Centre, Adelaide, a building in Adelaide
 Myer Centre, Brisbane, a shopping centre in Brisbane
 Myer House (disambiguation), several houses in the US National Register of Historic Places
 Fort Myer, a U.S. Army post in Virginia, not to be confused with Fort Myers, Florida
 MYER, ICAO code for Rock Sound International Airport, Bahamas 
 Myer Classic, an Australian Thoroughbred horse race

See also 
 Mayer (disambiguation)
 Meyer (disambiguation)
 Meyers (disambiguation)
 Myers (disambiguation)
 Von Meyer